Tecmo World Wrestling is a Nintendo Entertainment System professional wrestling game for one or two players released in 1989 where the player can control one of ten fictional international professional wrestlers. This is the first wrestling game to feature a play-by-play announcer, the animated Tom Talker, although his speech was only text bubbles. The game's text, e.g. Tom Talker's commentary, was translated from the Japanese game almost directly, leading to instances of Engrish. For example the Northern Lights Suplex is called "Northern Right Suplex". The game was released in Japan under the name

Gameplay
Tecmo World Wrestling contains more than 20 moves per wrestler, by virtue of not having a dedicated grapple button. Instead, a grapple is initiated whenever the wrestlers walk into each other, and from there, combinations of the joypad and buttons can be used to perform a variety of holds and slams. There are also many situational moves (such as ground attacks, high-risk top-rope aerial attacks, and running attacks) to perform.

In addition, the game was perhaps the first to feature action replays: when certain signature moves are performed on a weakened wrestler, the game introduces a quick cut-scene, showing the move being performed, as if in a close-up television replay.

Matches can be won by a standard three-count pinfall, submission, or by count-out (if a wrestler is tossed out of the ring, a twenty count starts, and if either wrestler is still outside of the ring when the count ends, they're disqualified).  In the single-player game, if both wrestlers are counted out, it counts as a loss for the player.

The single-player mode consists of defeating all of the other wrestlers in the game with your chosen wrestler.  Between matches, the player is given an option to train; through button mashing exercises, the player performs either squats, situps, or push-ups (with a sumo wrestler on his back).  When the meter measuring your progress in training fills up, a sphere above the meter (seven in total) fills up.  The more training you do, the more damage your moves will do during a match.  Once all seven spheres fill up, you cannot train any further; however, if you lose a match against an opponent, you will lose a sphere, and you must train again to regain it.  When all of the other wrestlers are defeated, the player must overcome the challenge of the non-playable final boss, "The Earl of Doom" Blue King, before winning the game.

Two-player mode in Tecmo World Wrestling features the same gameplay as the single-player game.  Each player selects a wrestler (the game prevents the same character being chosen for both players) and then proceed directly into the match.  The most notable difference from the single-player game is the addition of a momentum meter onscreen that rapidly swings back and forth between both players. This meter determines which player will have the advantage in a grappling situation.

Wrestlers

Japanese version
The Japanese version of the game, released as Gekitou Pro Wrestling!! Toukon Densetsu has some notable differences from the western release. It was released a year earlier and has a password feature. The announcer is also different, sporting black hair and more Japanese looking facial features, his name according to the Japanese manual is Yasushi Geki. The female personal trainer also sports black hair.

See also

References

External links
Tecmo World Wrestling at Hardcore Gaming 101

1989 video games
Nintendo Entertainment System games
Nintendo Entertainment System-only games
Tecmo games
Professional wrestling games
Multiplayer and single-player video games
Video games developed in Japan
Video games scored by Hiroshi Miyazaki